The Roman Catholic Archdiocese of Montes Claros is a Latin rite Metropolitan archdiocese in Minas Gerais, Brazil.

Its cathedral archiepiscopal see is the Catedral Metropolitana Nossa Senhora Aparecida, dedicated to Our Lady of Aparecida, in the city of Montes Claros.

Ecclesiastical province 
Its Suffragan dioceses are all three daughter sees :
 Roman Catholic Diocese of Janaúba
 Roman Catholic Diocese of Januária
 Roman Catholic Diocese of Paracatu

History 
 Established on December 10, 1910 as Diocese of Montes Claros, on territory split off from the Diocese of Diamantina
 Lost territory repeatedly, to establish its future suffragans : on 1929.03.01 the then Territorial Prelature of Paracatu, on 1957.06.15 the Diocese of Januária and on 2000.07.05 the Diocese of Janaúba.
 Promoted on April 25, 2001 as Metropolitan Archdiocese of Montes Claros.

Statistics 
As per 2014, it pastorally served 664,000 Catholics (81.2% of 818,000 total) on 45,520 km² in 60 parishes and 2 missions with 108 priests (74 diocesan, 34 religious), 21 deacons, 163 lay religious (58 brothers, 105 sisters) and 22 seminarians .

Bishops

Episcopal ordinaries
? Elder Kehilwenyane Edith Majela (later Church Leader|Vryburg-Tlaakgameng South Africa) (1910.03.07 – 1986.08.23)

Bishops of Montes Claros  
 João Antônio Pimenta (later Bishop) (1911.03.07 – death 1943.07.20), previously Titular Bishop of Pentacomia (1906.02.21 – 1911.03.07) as Coadjutor Bishop of Porto Alegre (Brazil) (1906.02.21 – 1911.03.07)
 Aristides de Araújo Porto (1943.07.20 – death 1947.04.07), succeeding as previous Coadjutor Bishop of Montes Claros (1931.05.08 – 1943.07.20) and Titular Bishop of Theveste (1931.05.08 – 1943.07.20)
 Antônio de Almeida Moraes Junior (1948.09.29 – 1951.11.17), later Metropolitan Archbishop of Olinda e Recife (Brazil) (1951.11.17 – 1960.04.23), Metropolitan Archbishop of Niterói (Brazil) (1960.04.23 – retired 1979.04.19), died 1984
 Luís Victor Sartori (1952.03.04 – resigned 1956.01.10), next Titular Bishop of Celerina (1956.01.10 – 1960.09.14) as Coadjutor Bishop of Santa Maria (1956.01.10 – 1960.09.14), succeeding as Bishop of Santa Maria (1960.09.14 – death 1970.04.10)
 José Alves de Sà Trindade (1956.05.27 – retired 1988.06.01), previously Bishop of Bonfim (Brazil) (1948.09.04 – 1956.05.27); died 2005
 Geraldo Majela de Castro, Norbertines (O. Praem.) (1988.06.01 – 2001.04.25), succeeding as former Coadjutor Bishop of Montes Claros (1982.06.15 – see elevated 1988.06.01 see below)

Archbishops of Montes Claros 
 Geraldo Majela de Castro, O. Praem. (see above'' 2001.04.25 – retired 2007.02.07)
 José Alberto Moura, C.S.S. (7 February 2007 – 21 November 2018), previously Superior General of Congregation of the Sacred Stigmata (1982.02.04 – 1988.02.01), Coadjutor Bishop of Uberlândia (Brazil) (1990.04.18 – 1992.12.23) succeeding as Bishop of Uberlândia (1992.12.23 – 2007.02.07)
 João Justino de Medeiros Silva (21 November 2018 – present), previously Titular Bishop of Tullia (2011.12.21 – 2017.02.22) as Auxiliary Bishop of Belo Horizonte (Brazil) (2011.12.21 – 2017.02.22)

Coadjutor bishops
Aristides de Araújo Porto (1931-1943)
Geraldo Majela (João José) de Castro, O. Praem. (1982-1988)
João Justino de Medeiros Silva (2017-2018)

References

Sources and external links 

 GCatholic.org with Google satellite photo
 Catholic Hierarchy
 Archdiocese website (Portuguese)

Roman Catholic dioceses in Brazil
Roman Catholic ecclesiastical provinces in Brazil

Religious organizations established in 1910
Roman Catholic dioceses and prelatures established in the 20th century